The United States District Court for the Western District of Virginia (in case citations, W.D. Va.) is a United States district court.

Appeals from the Western District of Virginia are taken to the United States Court of Appeals for the Fourth Circuit (except for patent claims and claims against the U.S. government under the Tucker Act, which are appealed to the Federal Circuit).

The court is seated at multiple locations in Virginia: Abingdon, Big Stone Gap, Charlottesville, Danville, Harrisonburg, Lynchburg and Roanoke.

History 
The United States District Court for the District of Virginia was one of the original 13 courts established by the Judiciary Act of 1789, on September 24, 1789.

On February 13, 1801, the Judiciary Act of 1801, divided Virginia into three judicial districts: the District of Virginia, which included the counties west of the Tidewater and south of the Rappahannock River; the District of Norfolk, which included the Tidewater counties south of the Rappahannock; and the District of Potomac, which included the counties north and east of the Rappahannock as well as Maryland counties along the Potomac. Just over a year later, on March 8, 1802, the Judiciary Act of 1801 was repealed and Virginia became a single District again, effective July 1, 1802.

At that time, West Virginia, was still part of Virginia, and was encompassed in Virginia's Western District, while the Eastern District essentially covered what is now the entire state of Virginia.

Counties of jurisdiction 

The Western District of Virginia covers the counties of Albemarle,  Alleghany,  Amherst,  Appomattox,  Augusta, Bath,  Bedford,  Bland,  Botetourt,  Buchanan,  Buckingham, Campbell, Carroll, Charlotte, Clarke, Craig, Culpeper,  Cumberland,  Dickenson,  Floyd, Fluvanna, Franklin, Frederick, Giles, Grayson, Greene, Halifax, Henry, Highland, Lee, Louisa, Madison, Montgomery, Nelson, Orange, Page, Patrick, Pittsylvania, Pulaski, Rappahannock, Roanoke, Rockbridge, Rockingham, Russell, Scott, Shenandoah, Smyth, Tazewell, Warren, Washington, Wise, and Wythe; and the independent cities of Bedford, Bristol, Buena Vista, Charlottesville, Covington, Danville, Galax, Harrisonburg, Lexington, Lynchburg, Martinsville, Norton, Radford, Roanoke, Salem, Staunton, Waynesboro, and Winchester.

Current judges 
:

Former judges

Chief judges

Succession of seats

U.S. Attorney and U.S. Marshal 

The U.S. Attorney for the Western District of Virginia represents the federal government in the court.  the  United States Attorney is Christopher R. Kavanaugh.

The  U.S. Marshal for the Western District of Virginia is Thomas L. Foster.

Former U.S. Attorneys 
 Thomas B. Mason (1961–1969)
 Leigh B. Hanes  (1969-1976)
 Paul R. Thomson Jr. (1976-1980)
 John S. Edwards (1980–1981)
 John P. Alderman (1981–1990)
 E. Montgomery Tucker (1990–1993)
 Robert P. Crouch Jr. (1993–2001)
 John L. Brownlee (2001–2008)
 Timothy J. Heaphy (2009–2015)
 John P. Fishwick Jr. (2015–2017)
 Thomas T. Cullen (2018–2020)
 Daniel P. Bubar (2020–2021) acting

See also 
 Courts of Virginia
 List of current United States district judges
 List of United States federal courthouses in Virginia

References

External links 
 United States District Court for the Western District of Virginia Official Website
 United States Attorney for the Western District of Virginia Official Website
 Federal Judicial Center Website - Judges of the W.D. Va.
 History of Marshals for the Western District of Virginia

Virginia, Western District
Virginia law
Washington County, Virginia
Wise County, Virginia
Charlottesville, Virginia
Danville, Virginia
Harrisonburg, Virginia
Lynchburg, Virginia
Roanoke, Virginia
1819 establishments in Virginia
Courthouses in Virginia
Western Virginia
Courts and tribunals established in 1819